The Rhenish German Coldblood, is a breed of heavy draught horse from the Rhineland area of western Germany. It was bred in second part of the nineteenth century, principally at the Prussian state stud at Schloss Wickrath in Wickrathberg, now part of Mönchengladbach in North Rhine-Westphalia.

History

The farmers of the Rhineland needed powerful horses to work the heavy loess soil of the area. In the nineteenth century various heavy horses were imported from neighbouring countries – Belgium, Denmark, France and the Netherlands – as were Clydesdale, Shire and Suffolk Punch animals from England; these led to little improvement of the local stock, partly because of acclimatisation problems, partly because of lack of a clear direction. In the 1870s the decision was taken at the Prussian state stud at Schloss Wickrath, at that time in the Rhine Province of the Kingdom of Prussia, to concentrate breeding on the Belgian type. The first Belgian stallions stood at Wickrath in 1876, and by 1880 there were fifty. A stud book was opened in 1892; there were 148 mares registered in that year. Numbers of the breed grew rapidly in the first half of the twentieth century, and by 1946 there were 26,990 registered mares. In some years 700 young stallions were presented for approval for breeding.

The Second World War caused a drastic decline in the Rhenish German Coldblood. While there was a brief revival in agricultural use of horses in the post-War years, the progressive mechanisation of agriculture led to a further decline. The Wickrath stud was closed in 1957, and merged into the stud of Warendorf, in Westphalia. By 1975 there were eleven mares and two stallions registered in the stud book. Numbers have slowly recovered, and in 2013 were reported as 1173 mares and 149 stallions.

The Rhenish German Coldblood was listed as "endangered" by the FAO in 2007; it is listed in Category III, "endangered" on the red list of the Gesellschaft zur Erhaltung alter und gefährdeter Haustierrassen.

Because of the political division of Germany in the aftermath of the Second World War, which lasted until the Fall of the Berlin Wall in 1989, there was for more than fifty years no possibility of interbreeding between populations of the Rhenish German Coldblood in West Germany and those in the East. Three regional sub-populations of the breed developed in East Germany during this time: the Altmärkisches Kaltblut in the historical Altmark region, the Mecklenburger Kaltblut in the historical Mecklenburg region, and the Sächsisch-Thüringisches Kaltblut in Thuringia and the former province of Saxony. As a result of their long reproductive isolation, the Mecklenburger and Sächsisch-Thüringische sub-populations, while genetically indistinguishable, are genetically distinct from the Rhenish German Coldblood of the western part of the country.

References

Horse breeds
Horse breeds originating in Germany
Horse breeds originating in Prussia
Animal breeds on the GEH Red List